Twisted Love is the ninth studio album by English rock band the Quireboys, released in 2016.

Track listing
All songs written by Spike and  Guy Griffin. Tracks 4,6, and 10 co-written with  Paul Guerin
 Torn and Frayed
 Ghost Train
 Killing Time
 Twisted Love 
 Breaking Rocks
 Gracie B, Pt. 2
 Life's a Bitch
 Stroll On
 Shotgun Way
 Midnight Collective

Personnel
Band members
 Jonathan "Spike" Gray – lead vocals
 Guy Griffin – lead guitar, rhythm guitar, backing vocals
 Paul Guerin – lead guitar, rhythm guitar, backing vocals
 Keith Weir – keyboards, backing vocals
 Dave McCluskey – drums
 Nick Malling – bass guitar

Additional musicians
 Lynne Jackaman – backing vocals
 Par Jansson - harmonica
 Jenny Palm – backing vocals

2016 albums
The Quireboys albums